Startsino is a rural locality (a selo) in Kalinnikovsky Selsoviet, Birsky District, Bashkortostan, Russia. The population was 263 as of 2010. There are 9 streets.

Geography 
Startsino is located 31 km southeast of Birsk (the district's administrative centre) by road. Kalinniki is the nearest rural locality.

References 

Rural localities in Birsky District